Drive by wire or DbW technology in the automotive industry is the use of electrical or electro-mechanical systems for performing vehicle functions traditionally achieved by mechanical linkages. This technology replaces the traditional mechanical control systems with electronic control systems using electromechanical actuators and human–machine interfaces such as pedal and steering feel emulators. Components such as the steering column, intermediate shafts, pumps, hoses, belts, coolers and vacuum servos and master cylinders are eliminated from the vehicle. This is similar to the fly-by-wire systems used widely in the aviation industry.

Common examples include electronic throttle control and brake-by-wire.

Advantages 
The electronic throttle system is significantly lighter, reducing weight in modern cars. They are easier to service and tune, as a technician can simply connect a computer and let the computer perform the tuning. Using an electronic control system also allows for much more precise control of the throttle opening compared to a cable that stretches over time. It also allows the throttle response to be programmed in by the manufacturers.

Because the steering wheel can be bypassed as an input device, safety can be improved by providing computer controlled intervention of vehicle controls with systems such as electronic stability control (ESC), adaptive cruise control and Lane Assist Systems. Some systems, with appropriate modification, allow for control by laptops or even game controllers.

Ergonomics can be improved by the amount of force and range of movement required by the driver and by greater flexibility in the location of controls.  This flexibility also significantly expands the number of options for the vehicle's design.

Disadvantages 
Drive by wire systems can be "hacked", and their control faulted or shut off, by either wired or wireless connections. 
Each drive-by-wire system leads to more motors in the vehicle and therefore a greater energy consumption. For instance, the drive-by-wire technology adds actuator motors to create the torque needed to turn the wheels, and a feedback transducer to create the "road feel" on the steering wheel.

Another disadvantage of the drive-by-wire system is the noticeable delay between hitting the gas pedal and feeling the engine respond, caused by the drive-by-wire system's inherent propagation delays.  However, in recent years a range of "throttle controllers" have hit the market to counteract this lag; such as the iDRIVE and Windbooster Throttle Controllers.

The drive by wire paradigm abandons the fail safe tradition of such components as power steering where the potential for failure of a sophisticated approach is covered by the ability of the simpler underlying mechanical system to provide backup functionality.

Throttle by wire 

This system helps accomplish vehicle propulsion by means of an electronic throttle without any cables from the accelerator pedal to the throttle valve of the engine. In electric vehicles, this system controls the electric motors by sensing the accelerator pedal input and sending commands to the power inverter modules.

Brake by wire 

A pure brake by wire system would eliminate the need for hydraulics completely by using motors to actuate calipers, in comparison to the currently existing technology where the system is designed to provide braking effort by building hydraulic pressure in the brake lines.

Shift by wire 

The direction of motion of the vehicle (Forward, Reverse) is set by commanding the actuators inside the transmission through electronic commands based on the current input from the driver (Park, Reverse, Neutral or Drive).

Steer by wire 

A car equipped with a steer-by-wire system is able to steer without a steering column. The control of the wheels' direction will be established through electric motors which are actuated by ECUs monitoring the steering wheel inputs from the driver.

The first production vehicle to implement this was the Infiniti Q50, but after negative comments they retrofitted the traditional hydraulic steering. Its implementation in road vehicles is limited by concerns over reliability although it has been demonstrated in several concept vehicles such as ThyssenKrupp Presta Steering's Mercedes-Benz Unimog, General Motors' Hy-wire and Sequel, Saabs Prometheus and the Mazda Ryuga. A rear wheel SbW system by Delphi called Quadrasteer is used on some pickup trucks but has had limited commercial success. 

On the 2020 24 Hours of Nürburgring, a Porsche Cayman GT4 equipped with a steer-by-wire system from Schaeffler Paravan Technologie finished the race in 2nd place on its class (29th overall). On the 2021 race, a Mercedes-AMG GT3 using the same system finished 16th overall.

Park by wire 

The parking pawl in a traditional automatic transmission has a mechanical link to the gear lever and locks the transmission in the park position when the vehicle is set in Park. A park  by wire system uses electronic commands to actuate the parking pawl by a motor when the driver puts the vehicle in park.

Safety critical systems 
Failures in electronic control units used to implement these drive by wire functionalists can lead to potential hazardous situations where the driver's ability to control the vehicle will depend on the vehicle operating scenario. For example, unintended acceleration, loss of braking, unintended steering, shift in the wrong direction and unintended roll away are some of the known hazards. Implementing drive by wire systems requires extensive testing and validation as is the case when any new technology is introduced.

Recently it has been demonstrated that some of these systems are susceptible to hacking, allowing for external control of the vehicle.  While generally such hack demonstrations like remote activation of the horn or windshield wipers/washers fall into the "annoying or amusing" category, other hacks involving the accelerator, brakes, and transmission have much more serious security and safety implications.

References

External links 
Sensor Market
Fusion of redundant information in brake-by-wire systems, using a fuzzy Voter
Position sensing in by-wire brake callipers using resolvers

defaultsort
Vehicle braking technologies
Vehicle safety technologies
Automotive steering technologies